Giles Stanley (born: 26 January 1965) is a sailor from South Africa. who represented his country at the 1992 Summer Olympics in Barcelona, Spain as crew member in the Soling. With helmsman Bruce Savage and fellow crew member Rick Mayhew they took the 14th place.

References

Living people
1965 births
Sailors at the 1992 Summer Olympics – Soling
Olympic sailors of South Africa
South African male sailors (sport)